The 2014 IPC Ice Sledge Hockey Women's International Cup was an international women's sledge hockey tournament and the first IPC Ice Sledge Hockey Women's International Cup in history. The event was held from November 7–9, 2014, in Brampton, Ontario, Canada. Three teams took part: the Canada women's national ice sledge hockey team, a unified team from Europe, and the United States women's national ice sledge hockey team. The tournament was sanctioned by the International Paralympic Committee.

The tournament became the Para Ice Hockey Women's World Challenge in 2022.

Round robin

Game 1:  3 - 0 
 (USA: Erica Mitchell 2, Kelsey DiClaudio 1)

Game 2:  6 - 1  Europe United
 (CAN: Ashley Goure 2, Corin Metzger 2, Danica McPhee, Geneva Coulter EUR: Annika Santanen)

Game 3:  9 - 0  Europe United
 (USA: Erica Mitchell 4, Kelsey DiClaudio 4, Robynne Hill 1)

Game 4:  6 - 3  Europe United
 (CAN: Geneva Coulter 2, Ashley Goure 1, Ally Godin 1, Christina Picton 1, EUR: Annika Santanen 2, Stine Frydenlund 1)

Game 5:  4 - 3 
 (USA: Kelsey DiClaudio 3, Morgan Hosbrough, CAN: Ashley Goure 3)

Game 6:  6 - 1  Europe United
 (USA: Kelsey DiClaudio 3, Susan Kluting 2, Nina Nissly EUR: Maren Norheim)

Semifinals  
 2 - 0  Europe United
 (CAN: Ashley Goure 2)

Finals  
 5 - 1  
 (USA: Kelsey DiClaudio 4, Erica Mitchell, CAN: Ashley Goure)

See also
 Ice sledge hockey
 Sledge hockey

References

World Para Ice Hockey Championships
International ice hockey competitions hosted by Canada
Sled
2014–15 in Canadian women's ice hockey